Bennett Harold Rochefort (August 15, 1896 – April 2, 1981) was an American Major League Baseball first baseman. He played for the Philadelphia Athletics during the  season. He played college ball at Temple University.

References

Major League Baseball first basemen
Philadelphia Athletics players
Temple Owls baseball players
Baseball players from Camden, New Jersey
1896 births
1981 deaths
Temple University alumni